The Centre de services scolaire de l'Or-et-des-Bois  (CSSOB) is a group of 5 Francophone school districts headquartered in Val-d'Or, Quebec.

Schools
Secondary:
 École secondaire La Concorde (Senneterre)
 École secondaire Le Transit (Val-d'Or)
 École secondaire Le Tremplin (Malartic)
 Polyvalente Le Carrefour (Val-d'Or)

Preschool/Primary:
 Chanoine-Delisle (Senneterre)
 Charles-René-Lalande (Rivière-Héva)
 Des Explorateurs (Malartic)
 Louis-Querbes (Cadillac)
 Notre-Dame-de-l'Assomption (Vassan)
 Notre-Dame-de-Fatima (Val-d'Or)
 Notre-Dame-du-Rosaire (Sullivan
 Papillon-d'Or (Val-d'Or) - Alternative school
 Pavillon Saint-Paul (Senneterre)
 Saint-Isidore (Val-Senneville)
 Saint-Joseph (Val-d'Or)
 Sainte-Lucie (Val-d'Or)
 Sainte-Marie (Val-d'Or)
 Saint-Philippe (Dubuisson)
 Saint-Sauveur (Val-d'Or)

See also
 Western Quebec School Board which operates Anglophone schools in CSOB areas

References

External links
 Commission scolaire de l'Or-et-des-Bois  

Val-d'Or
School districts in Quebec